Hoek van Holland Strand metro station is a metro station in Hook of Holland (Hoek van Holland), Netherlands. It consists of two tracks with side platforms, and was the terminus of the Schiedam–Hoek van Holland railway to Rotterdam when it opened on 1 June 1893. Its name is derived from the nearby North Sea beach, strand being Dutch for “beach”.

The Nederlandse Spoorwegen stopped operating the line, including Hoek van Holland Strand railway station, on 1 April 2017, and the line was transferred to the Rotterdam Metro. After reconstruction of the rail infrastructure and the facilities, the opening of the replacement metro line B station is expected in 2023, at which time it will become the new western terminus of the line. Metro line B service opened as far as the preceding station, Hoek van Holland Haven metro station, on 30 September 2019.

The new station will be much closer to the beach, so further west, than the original station.

Train services
Currently closed for reconstruction, the station has no regular service.

References

External links
 Dutch Public Transport journey planner

Rotterdam Metro stations
Railway stations opened in 1893
Railway stations on the Hoekse Lijn